Leroy is a census-designated place located in Washington County, Alabama, around  north of Mobile. As of the 2010 census, its population was 911.

Demographics

Notable people
Sammie Coates, NFL wide receiver for the Kansas City Chiefs
Phillip Ervin, professional baseball outfielder for the Cincinnati Reds
Emanuel King, former NFL player
Simmie Knox, American painter
Kelvin Moore, former first baseman for the Oakland Athletics
Danny Powell , Alabama baseball coaches Hall of Fame member
Clifton Covington , Draft Pick of San Francisco Giants
Clint Mosely , Auburn Quarterback

References 

Census-designated places in Alabama
Census-designated places in Washington County, Alabama